Mercoal, a former coal mining town, is located in the Yellowhead County of western Alberta, Canada. It was one of several communities along the historic Coal Branch segment of the  Grand Trunk Pacific Railway (now part of the Canadian National Railway), which included Embarras, Robb, Coalspur, Coal Valley, Cadomin, Luscar, and Mountain Park. At its peak in the late 1940s and early 1950s the town had over 800 residents. Mercoal declined after the mines closed in 1959, and it is now essentially a ghost town with only a small number of summer residences remaining. It is situated on Highway 40, 70 km southwest of Edson, 8 km (5 mi) west of Coalspur.

History 

Mercoal's name was an acronym for the McLeod River Hard Coal Company, co-owned by Nick Gurvich, who opened an underground coal mine in 1920. In 1924 the mine was sold to Saunders Ridge Coal Company, Ltd. The Mercoal mine was the last major operator in the Coal Branch area, and it attracted workers from other Coal Branch towns after the closure of the mines at Mountain Park in 1950 and Cadomin in 1952. The Mercoal mine finally closed on July 17, 1959.

References 

Ghost towns in Alberta
Localities in Yellowhead County